Kim Seung-hyuk (born 5 April 1986) is a South Korean professional golfer.

Kim plays on the Japan Golf Tour and Korean Tour. In 2014, he won the SK Telecom Open and the Kolon Korea Open, both co-sanctioned by the Korean and OneAsia Tours, and the Top Cup Tokai Classic on the Japan Golf Tour. He finished 2014 as the leading money winner on both the Korean Tour and the OneAsia Tour and 16th on the Japan Golf Tour.

Professional wins (5)

Japan Golf Tour wins (1)

OneAsia Tour wins (2)

1Co-sanctioned by the Korean Tour

Korean Tour wins (4)

1Co-sanctioned by the OneAsia Tour

References

External links

South Korean male golfers
Japan Golf Tour golfers
Sportspeople from Busan
1986 births
Living people